Lomatium foeniculaceum is a species of flowering plant in the carrot family known by the common name desert biscuitroot. It is native to much of western and central North America, where it grows in many types of habitat.

Description
Lomatium foeniculaceum is a hairy perennial herb growing up to 30 centimeters long from a taproot. It lacks a stem, producing upright inflorescences and leaves from ground level. The leaves are up to about 30 centimeters long and are intricately divided into many small, narrow segments. The inflorescence is an umbel of many spreading clusters of small yellow or purplish flowers. The plant has a strong scent and the edible leaves taste like parsley, a close relative.

External links
Jepson Manual Treatment - Lomatium foeniculaceum
USDA Plants Profile: Lomatium foeniculaceum
Missouri Plants
Lomatium foeniculaceum - Photo gallery

foeniculaceum
Flora of the Northwestern United States
Flora of the Southwestern United States
Flora of Western Canada
Flora of the California desert regions
Flora of the Great Basin
Taxa named by John Merle Coulter
Flora without expected TNC conservation status